The 2000 Irish Masters was the twenty-sixth edition of the professional invitational snooker tournament, which took place from 21 to 26 March 2000. The tournament was played at Goffs in Kill, County Kildare, and featured twelve professional players.

John Higgins won the tournament for the first time, defeating Stephen Hendry 9–4 in the final.

Main draw

References

Irish Masters
Irish Masters
Irish Masters
Irish Masters